Udayam Padinjaru is a 1986 Indian Malayalam film, directed and produced by Madhu. The film stars Madhu, Srividya, Prem Nazir and Shobhana in the lead roles. The film has musical score by A. T. Ummer and Jerry Amaldev.

Cast
Madhu
Srividya
Prem Nazir
Shobhana
Ratheesh
Bharath Gopi
Praveena
Premanand Ramachandran (Padmini's Son)

Soundtrack
The music was composed by A. T. Ummer and Jerry Amaldev and the lyrics were written by Puthusseri Ramachandran and Kavalam Narayana Panicker.

References

External links
 

1986 films
1980s Malayalam-language films